Youarang is a locality in northern Victoria, Australia in the local government area of the Shire of Moira. 

Youarang post office opened on 8 June 1877, closed on 17 December 1910, reopened on 19 September 1911 and closed on 1 August 1952.

References

Towns in Victoria (Australia)
Shire of Moira